The Lao National Museum is located in Vientiane, Laos. It was founded as the national museum highlighting the revolution of the 1970s and is located in a French colonial building. In 2007, the United States donated a grant to help develop the museum. The museum, which was originally built in 1925 as the French governor's residence, presents the history of Laos, highlighting the Laotian people's struggle to free the country from foreign occupiers and imperialist forces. It is located on Samsenthai road, opposite the Cultural Hall.

References

Literature

External links
Frommer's | Lao National Museum

Museums in Laos
Buildings and structures in Vientiane
Houses completed in 1925
Tourist attractions in Vientiane